Benjamin C. Thema (born 1912, died 1982) was a Motswana educationist and politician. 

Thema was born in Ranaka, Bangwaketse Reserve. He became the first president of Bechuanaland Student Association in 1939. In 1946 he founded the Tshidi Barolong secondary school in Mafikeng, and in 1955 became its principal.
 
He joined the Bechuanaland Democratic Party in 1964, and was elected to the National Assembly in the elections of 1965. Then he joined the cabinet, first as Minister of Finance 1965-1966, and from 1966 to 1974 as Minister of Education.

References

1912 births
1982 deaths
Botswana educators
Finance ministers of Botswana
Education ministers of Botswana
Botswana Democratic Party politicians 
Members of the National Assembly (Botswana)